

Events

January events
 January 1 – Government of India takes over East Indian Railway Company.

February events
 February 3 – Great Indian Peninsular Railway inaugurates first section of Bombay suburban electrification out of Victoria Terminus.
 February 16 – A new suspension bridge opens over Niagara Falls, replacing the previous span built in 1855.
 February 28 – The Chicago, Lake Shore and South Bend Railroad enters receivership.

March events 
 March 14 – Groundbreaking ceremonies for construction of the Independent Subway System's Eighth Avenue Line are held at 123rd Street and St. Nicholas Avenue.
 March 24 – The Gyokunan Electric Railway in Japan opens.

April events 
 April 24 – The first section of the Itsukaichi Railway opens between Haijima and Itsukaichi stations in Japan.

June events 
 June 23 – The Chicago South Shore and South Bend Railroad is incorporated and purchases the assets of the Chicago, Lake Shore and South Bend Railroad.

July events 
 July 1 – Government of India takes over Great Indian Peninsula Railway.
 July 5 – Samuel Insull begins serving as president of Chicago South Shore and South Bend Railroad with the introduction of major reconstruction projects for the railroad.
 July 10 – Tobu Tojo Line, Ikebukuro, Tokyo, to Yorii route officially completed in Japan.
 July 17 – Japanese Government Railways introduce automatic couplers in a 24-hour changeover.

September events 
 September 8 – Hull Electric Railway discontinues through service to Queen's Park, Toronto: passengers must now transfer to trains running from Aylmer.

October events
 October – Sir Henry Fowler succeeds George Hughes as Chief Mechanical Engineer of the London, Midland and Scottish Railway.
 October 22 – Central Railroad of New Jersey 1000, the first commercial diesel-electric locomotive, enters service at the Bronx Terminal Yard.

November events
 November 1 – Japan's Yamanote Line, which becomes one of Tokyo's busiest and most important commuter lines, opens.
 November 4 – Opening of Khyber Pass Railway, from Peshawar to Landi Kotal.
 November 21 – Seaboard Air Line introduces the “Orange Blossom Special”.

December events
 December 15 – Long Island Rail Road 401, the first diesel-electric locomotive used in mainline service, is demonstrated for the first time.

Unknown date events
 Rebuilding of Berlin Friedrichstraße station in Germany is completed.
 Henry deForest succeeds Julius Kruttschnitt as chairman of the executive committee for the Southern Pacific Company, the parent company of the Southern Pacific Railroad.
 Lima Locomotive Works builds the first 2-8-4 steam locomotives, their first "Super Power" types, for the Boston and Albany Railroad's routes through The Berkshires; also, the first production 2-10-4s, for the Texas and Pacific Railway.
 Electro-Motive Engineering changes its name to Electro-Motive Corporation (a company that would later become General Motors Electro-Motive Division).
 William W. Atterbury becomes president of the Pennsylvania Railroad.
 American Car and Foundry acquires Fageol and Hall-Scott.
 The New York Central Railroad establishes a new subsidiary, the Eastern Refrigerator Despatch. Operation of the ERD, along with its 2,100 reefers, is quickly absorbed by Merchants Despatch.

Births

Unknown date births 
 H. Reid, prominent railroad photographer and historian (died 1992).

Deaths

References
 White, John H., Jr. (Spring 1986). America's most noteworthy railroaders, Railroad History 154, p. 9-15.